Ostbach may refer to:

Ostbach (Else), a river of North Rhine-Westphalia, Germany, tributary of the Else
Ostbach (Emscher), a river of North Rhine-Westphalia, Germany, tributary of the Emscher